Patricia "Patty" Sullivan (born March 17, 1968) is a Canadian television presenter and actress. She is best known for hosting the TVOKids programming block on TVOntario from 1994 to 2003 and the Kids' CBC block on CBC Television from 2003 to 2016.

Career 

Following her graduation from the radio and television arts program at Ryerson Polytechnical Institute (now Toronto Metropolitan University) in 1990, Sullivan first pursued a career in journalism with a job in news radio before taking a job at provincial public broadcaster TVOntario (TVO).

After responding to an internal job posting for a children's television host, Sullivan began her career hosting the TVOKids programming block on TVO in 1994. She was part of the TVOKids production team that won an International Emmy Award for their 1995 International Children's Day of Broadcasting programming. She was dismissed from TVO in 2003 when the broadcaster alleged she had a conflict of interest when she hosted Animal Magnetism, a nature documentary series on the W Network, which aired at the same time as her TVOKids programming block. She later received an unspecified settlement from TVO.

Five months after leaving TVO, Sullivan was hired by the Canadian Broadcasting Corporation to be a host on the newly reformatted Kids' CBC programming block on CBC Television. In June 2016, CBC announced that Sullivan would be departing as host as part of a new reformatting of Kids' CBC for the winter of 2016.

Personal life
Sullivan lives in Toronto with her husband Michael Kinney and two daughters.

Filmography

TV
 TVOKids  (1994-2003) - Host
 The Last Don II (1998) - Southern California Reporter #1
 The Reading Rangers (2001) - Ranger Patty, Abel Johnson, Teeny
 Animal Magnetism (2003-2004) - Host
 Kids' CBC (2003–2016) - Host
 Murdoch Mysteries (2016) - Shop girl
 Conviction (2017) - Reese Barnes

References

External links

 
 Profile at CBC
 

1968 births
Living people
Actresses from Ontario
Canadian children's television personalities
CBC Television people
People from Burlington, Ontario
Toronto Metropolitan University alumni
Canadian bloggers
Canadian women bloggers
Canadian women television personalities